Anabremia is a genus of gall midge in the family Cecidomyiidae. The six described species are found in the Palearctic and likely inquilines of Dasineura galls on plants in the legume family. This genus was first described by Jean-Jacques Kieffer in 1912.

References

Cecidomyiidae
Insects described in 1912

Taxa named by Jean-Jacques Kieffer
Cecidomyiidae genera